Western Magpies may refer to;

Sports clubs 

 Western Suburbs Magpies, a NSWRL Premier League club
 Western Magpies Australian Football Club, an AFL Queensland State League club
 Western Suburbs Magpies AFC, Australian rules football club in Sydney

Birds 

 Western magpie, Gymnorhina tibicen dorsalis, subspecies of the Australian magpie